Zhang Hanzhi (14 July 1935 – 26 January 2008) was a Chinese diplomat who was Mao Zedong's English teacher and U.S. President Richard Nixon's interpreter during his historic 1972 trip to China.

Early life and education

Zhang was born in Shanghai in 1935, the love child of socialite Tan Xueqing and Chen Du, son of General Chen Tiaoyuan.  She was adopted by General Chen's friend, educator and statesman Zhang Shizhao. Her family moved to Beijing in 1949 and four years later, Zhang entered the Beijing Foreign Studies University, where she taught after graduating with a master's degree.

Career
Zhang first met Mao Zedong in 1950. She started to know him and translate English for him. The lessons abruptly stopped in 1964 as the Cultural Revolution began taking shape. In 1971, Zhang was transferred to China's Ministry of Foreign Affairs, where she began her diplomatic career and attended a series of landmark meetings, including the ones with Nixon, when the countries began restoring diplomatic relations.

Personal life
Zhang married her first husband Hong Junyan (洪君彦), a Peking University professor, in 1949. Zhang and Hong had a daughter, Hung Huang, who later became an entrepreneur and media figure.

In his memoir, Hong Junyan states that when he was persecuted and humiliated at the beginning of the Cultural Revolution, Zhang Hanzhi offered no sympathy and instead despised him. She began an affair with a colleague at the Beijing Foreign Languages Institute, and was caught in the act by Hong's sister. In 1969, Hong was sent to perform manual labour in Jiangxi Province, and when he returned to Beijing in 1971, rumours were circulating that Zhang was having an affair with Qiao Guanhua, the head of China's UN delegation. Zhang requested a divorce in December 1972, which was finalized in March 1973, and Zhang married Qiao afterwards.

Zhang died on 26 January 2008, due to a lung-related illness.

References

1935 births
2008 deaths
People's Republic of China translators
Chinese diplomats
Beijing Foreign Studies University alumni
Academic staff of Beijing Foreign Studies University
Writers from Shanghai
People's Republic of China essayists
Educators from Shanghai
20th-century essayists
20th-century Chinese translators
21st-century Chinese translators